The iPod is  a series of portable media players and multi-purpose mobile devices designed and marketed by Apple Inc. The first version was released on October 23, 2001, about  months after the Macintosh version of iTunes was released. Apple sold an estimated 450 million iPod products as of 2022. Apple discontinued the iPod product line on May 10, 2022. At over 20 years, the iPod brand is the oldest to be discontinued by Apple.

Like other digital music players, some versions of the iPod can serve as external data storage devices. Prior to macOS 10.15, Apple's iTunes software (and other alternative software) could be used to transfer music, photos, videos, games, contact information, e-mail settings, Web bookmarks, and calendars to the devices supporting these features from computers using certain versions of Apple macOS and Microsoft Windows operating systems.

Before the release of iOS 5, the iPod branding was used for the media player included with the iPhone and iPad, which was separated into apps named "Music" and "Videos" on the iPod Touch. As of iOS 5, separate Music and Videos apps are standardized across all iOS-powered products. While the iPhone and iPad have essentially the same media player capabilities as the iPod line, they are generally treated as separate products. During the middle of 2010, iPhone sales overtook those of the iPod.

History 

Portable MP3 players had existed since the mid-1990s, but Apple found existing digital music players "big and clunky or small and useless" with user interfaces that were "unbelievably awful". They also identified weaknesses in existing models' attempt to negotiate the trade-off between capacity and portability; flash memory-based players held too few songs, while the hard drive based models were too big and heavy. To address these deficits, the company decided to develop its own MP3 player.

At Apple CEO Steve Jobs’ direction, hardware engineering chief Jon Rubinstein recruited Tony Fadell, a former employee of General Magic and Philips, who had a business idea to invent a better MP3 player and build a complementary music sales store. Fadell had previously developed the Philips Velo and Nino PDA before starting a company called Fuse Systems to build the new MP3 player, but RealNetworks, Sony and Philips had already passed on the project. Rubinstein had already discovered the Toshiba hard disk drive while meeting with an Apple supplier in Japan, ultimately purchasing the rights to it for Apple. Rubinstein had also already made substantial progress on development of other key hardware elements, including the device's screen and battery.

Fadell found support for his project with Apple Computer and was hired by Apple in 2001 as an independent contractor to work on the iPod project, then code-named project P-68. Because most of Apple's engineering manpower and resources were already dedicated to the iMac line, Fadell hired engineers from his startup company, Fuse, and veteran engineers from General Magic and Philips to build the core iPod development team.

Time constraints forced Fadell to develop various components of the iPod outside Apple. Fadell partnered with a company called PortalPlayer to design software for the device; this work eventually took shape as the iPod OS. Within eight months, Tony Fadell's team and PortalPlayer had completed a prototype. The power supply was then designed by Michael Dhuey, while the display was designed in-house by Apple design engineer Jonathan Ive. The device's physical appearance was inspired by the 1958 Braun T3 transistor radio designed by Dieter Rams, while the wheel-based user interface drew on Bang & Olufsen's BeoCom 6000 telephone. Apple CEO Steve Jobs set an exacting standard for the device's physical design; one anecdote relates an occasion on which Jobs dropped a prototype into an aquarium in front of engineers to demonstrate from bubbles leaving its housing that the current design contained unused internal space.

Apple contracted another company, Pixo, to help design and implement the user interface (as well as Unicode, memory management, and event processing) under Jobs' direct supervision.

The name iPod was proposed by Vinnie Chieco, a freelance copywriter, who (with others) was contracted by Apple to determine how to introduce the new player to the public. After Chieco saw a prototype, he was reminded of the phrase "Open the pod bay doors, Hal" from the classic sci-fi film  2001: A Space Odyssey, referring to the white EVA Pods of the Discovery One spaceship. Chieco's proposal drew an analogy between the relationship of the spaceship to the smaller independent pods and that of a personal computer to its companion music player.

The product (which Fortune called "Apple's 21st-Century Walkman") was developed in less than one year and unveiled on October 23, 2001. Jobs announced it as a Mac-compatible product with a 5 GB hard drive that put "1,000 songs in your pocket."

Apple researched the trademark and found that it was already in use. Joseph N. Grasso of New Jersey had originally listed an "iPod" trademark with the U.S. Patent and Trademark Office (USPTO) in July 2000 for Internet kiosks. The first iPod kiosks had been demonstrated to the public in New Jersey in March 1998, and commercial use began in January 2000, but the venture had apparently been discontinued by 2001. The trademark was registered by the USPTO in November 2003, and Grasso assigned it to Apple Computer, Inc. in 2005.

The earliest recorded use in commerce of an "iPod" trademark was in 1991 by Chrysalis Corp. of Sturgis, Michigan, styled "iPOD", for office furniture.

As development progressed, Apple continued to refine the software's look and feel, rewriting much of the code. Starting with the iPod Mini, the Chicago font was replaced with Espy Sans. Later iPods switched fonts again to Podium Sans—a font similar to Apple's corporate font, Myriad. Color display iPods then adopted some Mac OS X themes like Aqua progress bars, and brushed metal meant to evoke a combination lock.

On January 8, 2004, Hewlett-Packard (HP) announced that they would sell HP-branded iPods under a license agreement from Apple. Several new retail channels were used—including Walmart—and these iPods eventually made up 5% of all iPod sales. In July 2005, HP stopped selling iPods due to unfavorable terms and conditions imposed by Apple.

In 2006, Apple partnered with Irish rock band U2 to present a special edition of the 5th-generation iPod. Like its predecessor, this iPod has the signatures of the four members of the band engraved on its back, but this one was the first time the company changed the color of the stainless steel back from a silver chrome to black. This iPod was only available with 30 GB of storage capacity. The special edition entitled purchasers to an exclusive video with 33 minutes of interviews and performance by U2, downloadable from the iTunes Store.

In 2007, Apple modified the iPod interface again with the introduction of the sixth-generation iPod Classic and third-generation iPod Nano by changing the font to Helvetica and, in most cases, splitting the screen in half, displaying the menus on the left and album artwork, photos, or videos on the right.

In mid-2015, several new color schemes for all of the current iPod models were spotted in the iTunes 12.2 update. Belgian website Belgium iPhone originally found the images after plugging in an iPod for the first time, and subsequent photos were discovered by Pierre Dandumont before being leaked.

On July 27, 2017, Apple removed the iPod Nano and Shuffle from its stores, marking the end of Apple's production of standalone music players. On May 10, 2022, Apple discontinued the iPod Touch, the last remaining product in the iPod line. iOS 15 was the last iOS release the 7th generation iPod touch received, as future versions from iOS 16 onward will no longer support the device.

Hardware

Audio 
Audio tests showed that the third-generation iPod has a weak bass response. The combination of the undersized DC-blocking capacitors and the typical low impedance of most consumer headphones form a high-pass filter, which attenuates the low-frequency bass output. Similar capacitors were used in the fourth-generation iPods. The problem is reduced when using high-impedance headphones and is completely masked when driving high-impedance (line level) loads, such as when using an external headphone amplifier. The first-generation iPod Shuffle uses a dual-transistor output stage, rather than a single capacitor-coupled output, and does not exhibit reduced bass response for any load.

For all iPods released in 2006 and earlier, some equalizer (EQ) sound settings can easily distort the bass sound, even on undemanding tracks. This occurs when using EQ settings such as R&B, Rock, Acoustic, and Bass Booster, because the equalizer amplifies the digital audio level beyond the software's limit, causing distortion (clipping) on bass instruments.

From the fifth-generation iPod on, Apple introduced a user-configurable volume limit in response to concerns about hearing loss. Users report that in the sixth-generation iPod, the maximum volume output level is limited to 100 dB in EU markets. Apple previously had to remove iPods from shelves in France for exceeding this legal limit. However, users who bought new sixth-generation iPods in late 2013 reported a new option that allowed them to disable the EU volume limit. Some have attributed this change to a software update that shipped with these devices. Older sixth-generation iPods, however, are unable to update to this software version.

Connectivity 

Originally, a FireWire connection to the host computer was used to update songs or recharge the battery. The battery could also be charged with a power adapter that was included with the first four generations.

The third generation began including a 30-pin dock connector, allowing for FireWire or USB connectivity. This provided better compatibility with non-Apple machines, as most of them did not have FireWire ports at the time. Eventually, Apple began shipping iPods with USB cables instead of FireWire, although the latter was available separately. As of the first-generation iPod Nano and the fifth-generation iPod Classic, Apple discontinued using FireWire for data transfer (while still allowing for use of FireWire to charge the device) in an attempt to reduce cost and form factor. As of the second-generation iPod Touch and the fourth-generation iPod Nano, FireWire charging ability has been removed. The second-, third-, and fourth-generation iPod Shuffle uses a single 3.5 mm minijack phone connector which acts as both a headphone jack or a USB data and charging port for the dock/cable.

The dock connector also allowed the iPod to connect to accessories, which often supplement the iPod's music, video, and photo playback. Apple sells a few accessories, such as the now-discontinued iPod Hi-Fi, but most are manufactured by third parties such as Belkin and Griffin. Some peripherals use their own interface, while others use the iPod's own screen. Because the dock connector is a proprietary interface, the implementation of the interface requires paying royalties to Apple.

Apple introduced a new 8-pin dock connector, named Lightning, on September 12, 2012 with their announcement of the iPhone 5, the fifth-generation iPod Touch, and the seventh-generation iPod Nano, which all feature it. The new connector replaces the older 30-pin dock connector used by older iPods, iPhones, and iPads. Apple Lightning cables have pins on both sides of the plug so it can be inserted with either side facing up.

Bluetooth connectivity was added to the last model of the iPod Nano, and Wi-Fi to the iPod Touch.

Accessories 

Many accessories have been made for the iPod line. A large number are made by third-party companies, although many, such as the iPod Hi-Fi and iPod Socks, are made by Apple. Some accessories add extra features that other music players have, such as sound recorders, FM radio tuners, wired remote controls, and audio/visual cables for TV connections. Other accessories offer unique features like the Nike+iPod pedometer and the iPod Camera Connector. Other notable accessories include external speakers, wireless remote controls, protective case, screen films, and wireless earphones. Among the first accessory manufacturers were Griffin Technology, Belkin, JBL, Bose, Monster Cable, and SendStation.

BMW released the first iPod automobile interface, allowing drivers of newer BMW vehicles to control an iPod using either the built-in steering wheel controls or the radio head-unit buttons. Apple announced in 2005 that similar systems would be available for other vehicle brands, including Mercedes-Benz, Volvo, Nissan, Toyota, Alfa Romeo, Ferrari, Acura, Audi, Honda, Renault, Infiniti and Volkswagen. Scion offers standard iPod connectivity on all their cars.

Some independent stereo manufacturers including JVC, Pioneer, Kenwood, Alpine, Sony, and Harman Kardon also have iPod-specific integration solutions. Alternative connection methods include adapter kits (that use the cassette deck or the CD changer port), audio input jacks, and FM transmitters such as the iTrip—although personal FM transmitters are illegal in some countries. Many car manufacturers have added audio input jacks as standard.

Beginning in mid-2007, four major airlines, United, Continental, Delta, and Emirates, reached agreements to install iPod seat connections. The free service will allow passengers to power and charge an iPod, and view video and music libraries on individual seat-back displays. Originally KLM and Air France were reported to be part of the deal with Apple, but they later released statements explaining that they were only contemplating the possibility of incorporating such systems.

Software 
The iPod line can play several audio file formats including MP3, AAC/M4A, Protected AAC, AIFF, WAV, Audible audiobook, and Apple Lossless. The iPod Photo introduced the ability to display JPEG, BMP, GIF, TIFF, and PNG image file formats. Fifth- and sixth-generation iPod Classic models, as well as third-generation iPod Nano models, can also play MPEG-4 (H.264/MPEG-4 AVC) and QuickTime video formats, with restrictions on video dimensions, encoding techniques and data rates. Originally, iPod software only worked with Classic Mac OS and macOS; iPod software for Microsoft Windows was launched with the second-generation model. Unlike most other media players, Apple does not support Microsoft's WMA audio format—but a converter for WMA files without digital rights management (DRM) is provided with the Windows version of iTunes. MIDI files also cannot be played, but can be converted to audio files using the "Advanced" menu in iTunes. Alternative open-source audio formats, such as Ogg Vorbis and FLAC, are not supported without installing custom firmware onto an iPod (e.g., Rockbox).

During installation, an iPod is associated with one host computer. Each time an iPod connects to its host computer, iTunes can synchronize entire music libraries or music playlists either automatically or manually. Song ratings can be set on an iPod and synchronized later to the iTunes library, and vice versa. A user can access, play, and add music on a second computer if an iPod is set to manual and not automatic sync, but anything added or edited will be reversed upon connecting and syncing with the main computer and its library. If a user wishes to automatically sync music with another computer, an iPod's library will be entirely wiped and replaced with the other computer's library.

Interface 

iPods with color displays use anti-aliased graphics and text, with sliding animations. All iPods (except the 3rd-generation iPod Shuffle, the 6th & 7th generation iPod Nano, and iPod Touch) have five buttons and the later generations have the buttons integrated into the click wheel – an innovation that gives an uncluttered, minimalist interface. The buttons perform basic functions such as menu, play, pause, next track, and previous track. Other operations, such as scrolling through menu items and controlling the volume, are performed by using the click wheel in a rotational manner. The 3rd-generation iPod Shuffle does not have any controls on the actual player; instead, it has a small control on the earphone cable, with volume-up and -down buttons and a single button for play and pause, next track, etc. The iPod Touch has no click-wheel; instead, it uses a touch screen along with a home button, sleep/wake button, and (on the second and third generations of the iPod Touch) volume-up and -down buttons. The user interface for the iPod Touch is identical to that of the iPhone. Differences include the lack of a phone application. Both devices use iOS.

iTunes Store 

The iTunes Store (introduced April 29, 2003) is an online media store run by Apple and accessed through iTunes. The store became the market leader soon after its launch and Apple announced the sale of videos through the store on October 12, 2005. Full-length movies became available on September 12, 2006.

At the time the store was introduced, purchased audio files used the AAC format with added encryption, based on the FairPlay DRM system. Up to five authorized computers and an unlimited number of iPods could play the files. Burning the files with iTunes as an audio CD, then re-importing would create music files without the DRM. The DRM could also be removed using third-party software. However, in a deal with Apple, EMI began selling DRM-free, higher-quality songs on the iTunes Stores, in a category called "iTunes Plus." On January 6, 2009, Apple announced that DRM has been removed from 80% of the music catalog and that it would be removed from all music by April 2009.

iPods cannot play music files from competing music stores that use rival-DRM technologies like Microsoft's protected WMA or RealNetworks' Helix DRM. Example stores include Napster and MSN Music. RealNetworks claims that Apple is creating problems for itself by using FairPlay to lock users into using the iTunes Store. Steve Jobs stated that Apple makes little profit from song sales, although Apple uses the store to promote iPod sales. However, iPods can also play music files from online stores that do not use DRM, such as eMusic or Amie Street.

Universal Music Group decided not to renew their contract with the iTunes Store on July 3, 2007. Universal will now supply iTunes in an 'at will' capacity.

Apple debuted the iTunes Wi-Fi Music Store on September 5, 2007, in its Media Event entitled "The Beat Goes On...". This service allows users to access the Music Store from either an iPhone or an iPod Touch and download songs directly to the device that can be synced to the user's iTunes Library over a WiFi connection, or, in the case of an iPhone, the telephone network.

Games 

Video games are playable on various versions of iPods. The original iPod had the game Brick (originally invented by Apple's co-founder Steve Wozniak) included as an easter egg hidden feature; later firmware versions added it as a menu option. Later revisions of the iPod added three more games: Parachute, Solitaire, and Music Quiz.

In September 2006, the iTunes Store began to offer additional games for purchase with the launch of iTunes 7, compatible with the fifth generation iPod with iPod software 1.2 or later. Those games were: Bejeweled, Cubis 2, Mahjong, Mini Golf, Pac-Man, Tetris, Texas Hold 'Em, Vortex, Asphalt 4: Elite Racing and Zuma. Additional games have since been added. These games work on the 6th and 5th generation iPod Classic and the 5th and 4th generation iPod Nano.

With third parties like Namco, Square Enix, Electronic Arts, Sega, and Hudson Soft all making games for the iPod, Apple's MP3 player has taken steps towards entering the video game handheld console market. Even video game magazines like GamePro and EGM have reviewed and rated most of their games as of late.

The games are in the form of .ipg files, which are actually .zip archives in disguise. When unzipped, they reveal executable files along with common audio and image files, leading to the possibility of third party games. Apple has not publicly released a software development kit (SDK) for iPod-specific development. Apps produced with the iPhone SDK are compatible only with the iOS on the iPod Touch and iPhone, which cannot run click wheel-based games.

File storage and transfer 
All iPods except for the iPod Touch can function in "disk mode" as mass storage devices to store data files but this has to be manually activated. If an iPod is formatted on a Mac OS computer, it uses the HFS+ file system format, which allows it to serve as a boot disk for a Mac computer. If it is formatted on Windows, the FAT32 format is used. With the release of the Windows-compatible iPod, the default file system used on the iPod line switched from HFS+ to FAT32, although it can be reformatted to either file system (excluding the iPod Shuffle which is strictly FAT32). Generally, if a new iPod (excluding the iPod Shuffle) is initially plugged into a computer running Windows, it will be formatted with FAT32, and if initially plugged into a Mac running Mac OS it will be formatted with HFS+.

Unlike many other MP3 players, simply copying audio or video files to the drive with a typical file management application will not allow an iPod to properly access them. The user must use software that has been specifically designed to transfer media files to iPods so that the files are playable and viewable. Usually iTunes is used to transfer media to an iPod, though several alternative third-party applications are available on a number of different platforms.

iTunes 7 and above can transfer purchased media of the iTunes Store from an iPod to a computer, provided that computer containing the DRM protected media is authorized to play it.

Media files are stored on an iPod in a hidden folder, along with a proprietary database file. The hidden content can be accessed on the host operating system by enabling hidden files to be shown. The media files can then be recovered manually by copying the files or folders off the iPod. Many third-party applications also allow easy copying of media files off of an iPod.

Models and features 

While the suffix "Classic" was not introduced until the sixth generation, it has been applied here retroactively to all non-suffixed iPods for clarity.

Patent disputes 
In 2005, Apple faced two lawsuits claiming patent infringement by the iPod line and its associated technologies: Advanced Audio Devices claimed the iPod line breached its patent on a "music jukebox", while a Hong Kong-based IP portfolio company called Pat-rights filed a suit claiming that Apple's FairPlay technology breached a patent issued to inventor Ho Keung Tse. The latter case also includes the online music stores of Sony, RealNetworks, Napster, and Musicmatch as defendants.

Apple's application to the United States Patent and Trademark Office for a patent on "rotational user inputs", as used on the iPod interface, received a third "non-final rejection" (NFR) in August 2005. Also in August 2005, Creative Technology, one of Apple's main rivals in the MP3 player market, announced that it held a patent on part of the music selection interface used by the iPod line, which Creative Technology dubbed the "Zen Patent", granted on August 9, 2005. On May 15, 2006, Creative filed another suit against Apple with the United States District Court for the Northern District of California. Creative also asked the United States International Trade Commission to investigate whether Apple was breaching U.S. trade laws by importing iPods into the United States.

On August 24, 2006, Apple and Creative announced a broad settlement to end their legal disputes. Apple will pay Creative US$100 million for a paid-up license, to use Creative's awarded patent in all Apple products. As part of the agreement, Apple will recoup part of its payment, if Creative is successful in licensing the patent. Creative then announced its intention to produce iPod accessories by joining the Made for iPod program.

Sales 

Sales of iPods peaked in 2008, following rapid growth in the period of 2005 to 2007.

In January 2007, Apple reported record quarterly revenue of US$7.1 billion, of which 48% was made from iPod sales. On April 9, 2007, it was announced that Apple had sold its one-hundred millionth iPod, making it the best-selling digital music player of all time. Its second-quarter revenue of US$5.2 billion, of which 32% was made from iPod sales. Apple and several industry analysts suggest that iPod users are likely to purchase other Apple products such as Mac computers. 42% of Apple's revenue for the First fiscal quarter of 2008 came from iPod sales (followed by 21% from notebook sales and 16% from desktop sales).

On October 21, 2008, Apple reported that only 14.21% of total revenue for fiscal quarter 4 of the year 2008 came from iPods. At the September 9, 2009 keynote presentation at the Apple Event, Phil Schiller announced total cumulative sales of iPods exceeded 220 million. The continual decline of iPod sales since 2009 has not been a surprising trend for the Apple corporation, as Apple CFO Peter Oppenheimer explained in June 2009: "We expect our traditional MP3 players to decline over time as we cannibalize ourselves with the iPod Touch and the iPhone." Since 2009, the company's iPod sales have continually decreased every financial quarter and in 2013 a new model was not introduced onto the market.

, Apple reported that total number of iPods sold worldwide was 350 million.

Market share 
Since October 2004, the iPod line has dominated digital music player sales in the United States, with over 90% of the market for hard drive-based players and over 70% of the market for all types of players. During the year from January 2004 to January 2005, the high rate of sales caused its U.S. market share to increase from 31% to 65%, and in July 2005, this market share was measured at 74%. In January 2007 the iPod market share reached 72.7% according to Bloomberg Online. In the Japanese market iPod market share was 36% in 2005, albeit still leader there. In Europe, Apple also led the market (especially the UK) but local brands such as Archos managed to outsell Apple in certain categories.

One of the reasons for the iPod's early success, having been released three years after the very first digital audio player (namely the MPMan), was its seamless integration with the company's iTunes software, and the ecosystem built around it such as the iTunes Music Store, as well as a competitive price. As a result, Apple achieved a dominance in the MP3 player market as Sony's Walkman did with personal cassette players two decades earlier. The software similarity between computer and player made it easy to transfer music over and synchronize it, tasks that were considered difficult on pre-iPod MP3 players such as those from Rio and Creative.

Some of the iPod's chief competitors during its pinnacle include Creative's Zen, SanDisk's Sansa, Sony's Walkman, iriver, and Samsung's Yepp. The iPod's dominance was challenged numerous times: in 2004 Sony's first hard disk Walkman was designed to take on the iPod, accompanied by its own music store Sony Connect; Microsoft initially attempted to compete using a software platform called Portable Media Center, and in later years designed the Zune line; the most vocal rival was Creative, whose CEO in November 2004 "declared war" on the iPod. Samsung declared that they would take the top spot from Apple by 2007, while SanDisk ran a specific anti-iPod marketing campaign called iDon't. These competitors failed to make major dents, and Apple remained dominant in the fast-growing digital audio player market during the decade. Mobile phone manufacturers Nokia and Sony Ericsson also made "music phones" to rival iPod. 

A suggested factor of iPod's popularity has been cited to be Apple's popular iTunes Store catalog, playing a part in keeping Apple firmly market leader, while also helped by the mismanagement of others, such as Sony's unpopular SonicStage software.

One notable exception where iPod was not faring well was in South Korea, where as of 2005 Apple held a small market share of less than 2%, compared to market leaders iriver, Samsung and Cowon.

As of 2011, iPod held a 70% market share in global MP3 players. Its closest competitor was noted to be the Sansa line from SanDisk.

Industry impact 
iPods have won several awards ranging from engineering excellence, to most innovative audio product, to fourth-best computer product of 2006. iPods often receive favorable reviews; scoring on looks, clean design, and ease of use. PC World wrote that iPod line has "altered the landscape for portable audio players". Several industries are modifying their products to work better with both the iPod line and the AAC audio format. Examples include CD copy-protection schemes, and mobile phones, such as phones from Sony Ericsson and Nokia, which play AAC files rather than WMA.

Besides earning a reputation as a respected entertainment device, the iPod has also been accepted as a business device. Government departments, major institutions, and international organizations have turned to the iPod line as a delivery mechanism for business communication and training, such as the Royal and Western Infirmaries in Glasgow, Scotland, where iPods are used to train new staff.

iPods have also gained popularity for use in education. Apple offers more information on educational uses for iPods on its website, including a collection of lesson plans. There has also been academic research done in this area in nursing education and more general K-16 education. Duke University provided iPods to all incoming freshmen in the fall of 2004, and the iPod program continues today with modifications. Entertainment Weekly put it on its end-of-the-decade, "best-of" list, saying, "Yes, children, there really was a time when we roamed the earth without thousands of our favorite jams tucked comfortably into our hip pockets. Weird."

The iPod has also been credited with accelerating shifts within the music industry. The iPod's popularization of digital music storage allows users to abandon listening to entire albums and instead be able to choose specific singles which hastened the end of the Album Era in popular music.

Criticism

Battery problems 
The advertised battery life on most models is different from the real-world achievable life. For example, the fifth-generation  iPod Classic was advertised as having up to 14 hours of music playback. However, an MP3.com report stated that this was virtually unachievable under real-life usage conditions, with a writer for the site getting, on average, less than 8 hours from an iPod. In 2003, class action lawsuits were brought against Apple complaining that the battery charges lasted for shorter lengths of time than stated and that the battery degraded over time. The lawsuits were settled by offering individuals with first- or second-generation iPods either  store credit or a free battery replacement, and offering individuals with third-generation iPods an extended warranty that would allow them to get a replacement iPod if they experienced battery problems.

As an instance of planned obsolescence, iPod batteries are not designed to be removed or replaced by the user, although some users have been able to open the case themselves, usually following instructions from third-party vendors of iPod replacement batteries. Compounding the problem, Apple initially would not replace worn-out batteries. The official policy was that the customer should buy a refurbished replacement iPod, at a cost almost equivalent to a brand new one. All lithium-ion batteries lose capacity during their lifetime even when not in use (guidelines are available for prolonging life-span) and this situation led to a market for third-party battery replacement kits.

Apple announced a battery replacement program on November 14, 2003, a week before a high publicity stunt and website by the Neistat Brothers. For the iPod Nano, soldering tools are needed because the battery is soldered onto the main board. Fifth generation iPods have their battery attached to the backplate with adhesive.

The first generation iPod Nano may overheat and pose a health and safety risk. Affected iPod Nanos were sold between September 2005 and December 2006. This is due to a flawed battery used by Apple from a single battery manufacturer. Apple recommended that owners of affected iPod Nanos stop using them. Under an Apple product replacement program, affected Nanos were replaced with current generation Nanos free of charge.

Reliability and durability 
iPods have been criticized for alleged short lifespan and fragile hard drives. A 2005 survey conducted on the MacInTouch website found that the iPod line had an average failure rate of 13.7% (although they note that comments from respondents indicate that "the true iPod failure rate may be lower than it appears"). It concluded that some models were more durable than others. In particular, failure rates for iPods employing hard drives were usually above 20% while those with flash memory had a failure rate below 10%. In late 2005, many users complained that the surface of the first-generation iPod Nano can become scratched easily, rendering the screen unusable. A class-action lawsuit was also filed. Apple initially considered the issue a minor defect, but later began shipping these iPods with protective sleeves.

Labor disputes 
On June 11, 2006, the British tabloid The Mail on Sunday reported that iPods are mainly manufactured by workers who earn no more than US$50 per month and work 15-hour shifts. Apple investigated the case with independent auditors and found that, while some of the plant's labor practices met Apple's Code of Conduct, others did not: employees worked over 60 hours a week for 35% of the time and worked more than six consecutive days for 25% of the time.

Foxconn, Apple's manufacturer, initially denied the abuses, but when an auditing team from Apple found that workers had been working longer hours than were allowed under Chinese law, they promised to prevent workers working more hours than the code allowed. Apple hired a workplace standards auditing company, Verité, and joined the Electronic Industry Code of Conduct Implementation Group to oversee the measures. On December 31, 2006, workers at the Foxconn factory in Longhua, Shenzhen formed a union affiliated with the All-China Federation of Trade Unions, the Chinese government-approved union umbrella organization.

In 2010, a number of workers committed suicide at a Foxconn operations in China. Apple, HP, and others stated that they were investigating the situation. Foxconn guards have been videotaped beating employees. Another employee killed himself in 2009 when an Apple prototype went missing, and claimed in messages to friends, that he had been beaten and interrogated.

As of 2006, the iPod was produced by about 14,000 workers in the U.S. and 27,000 overseas. Further, the salaries attributed to this product were overwhelmingly distributed to highly skilled U.S. professionals, as opposed to lower-skilled U.S. retail employees or overseas manufacturing labor. One interpretation of this result is that U.S. innovation can create more jobs overseas than domestically.

Timeline of models

See also 
 Comparison of portable media players
 Comparison of iPod managers
 iPhone
 Podcast
 iPad

Notes

References

External links 

  – official site at Apple Inc.
 iPod troubleshooting basics and service FAQ at Apple Inc.
 Apple's 21st century Walkman article, Brent Schlender, Fortune, November 12, 2001
 , Steven Levy, Newsweek, July 26, 2004
 The Perfect Thing article, Steven Levy, Wired, November 2006
 iPod (1st generation) complete disassembly at TakeItApart.com

 
Apple Inc. hardware
Computer-related introductions in 2001
Digital audio players
Foxconn
ITunes
Portable media players
Products introduced in 2001
Products and services discontinued in 2022